Beddy Rays are an Australian rock band from the outer Brisbane suburb of Redland Bay, Queensland. With music described as "rollicking coastal punk rock", they are best known for their 2020 single "Sobercoaster". The band have supported Tones and I on tour, as well as Dune Rats and Hockey Dad.

Origins
The four band members—Jacko, Lewy, Brad, and Benny—met in 2002 as young children at primary school. Their band name is derived from a spoonerism of "Reddy Bay", which is a common abbreviation for Redland Bay. All four band members are from Redland Bay, including Jacko who is a Woppaburra man, and work as tradesmen. Beddy Rays came to play some of their first shows by networking at various Brisbane venues for which they worked as tradies.

Career
Beddy Rays released their first EP Lost Found Beat Around in 2017. Their 2020 single "Sobercoaster" led the band to be featured as a Triple J Unearthed Feature Artist in mid-2020.

On 19 November 2021, the band released "On My Own".

Their self-titled, debut studio album was announced on 2 June 2022 and was released on 29 July 2022. It peaked at number 8 on the ARIA Charts.

Members 

 Jackson Van Issum (Jacko) - Vocals & Guitar
Lewis McKenna - Guitar 
Bradley O'Connor -Bass 
Benjamin Wade - Drums

Discography

Studio albums

Extended plays

Singles

Awards and nominations

ARIA Music Awards
The ARIA Music Awards is an annual awards ceremony that recognises excellence, innovation, and achievement across all genres of Australian music. They commenced in 1987. 

! 
|-
| rowspan="1"| 2022
| rowspan="1"| Beddy Rays
| Michael Gudinski Breakthrough Artist
| 
| rowspan="1"| 
|-

National Indigenous Music Awards
The National Indigenous Music Awards recognise excellence, innovation and leadership among Aboriginal and Torres Strait Islander musicians from throughout Australia. They commenced in 2004.

! 
|-
! scope="row" rowspan="1"| 2021
| Beddy Rays
| New Artist of the Year
| 
| 
|}

References

Australian punk rock groups
Musical groups from Brisbane
People from Redland City